Cactin also known as renal carcinoma antigen NY-REN-24 is a protein that in humans is encoded by the CACTIN gene.

Cactin was originally identified in Drosophila (fruit flies). The cactin gene is product is involved in the regulation of the innate immune system.  It acts as negative regulator of the toll-like receptor, Interferon regulatory factor (IRF) and the canonical NF-kappa-B signaling pathways.

Structure 

The full-length cactin protein length is 3,150 bp long and with an N-terminus from 356–547 residues and a domain in the C-terminal 731–855 residues.

Species and tissue distributhion 

This protein resides in many organs and tissues of all vertebrates, however, it has also been found in plants, protist, and fungi. The location that is highest in concentration of cactin gene is in the testis of males and in the spleen. The cactin gene in this specific area like the testis, enables RNA binding activity. This protein was also found to be involved in other process like cellular response from cytokines and negative signal transduction (negative feed back loops).

In plants 

In plants, the cactcin is associated with SR proteins localized in nuclear speckles. Plant and human cells share the same spliceosomal proteins, which involved the removal of introns in order to form mature messenger RNA.

References

Further reading 

 
 
 
 
 

Proteins